The Battle of Almansa reenactment is an annual modern recreation of the battle of Almansa of 1707. This took place in Almansa, Spain, during the War of the Spanish Succession. The event is organized by the Asociación 1707 Almansa Historica. The 2019 event will take place April 26th - April 28th 2019.

References

Historical reenactment events
Military reenactment
Province of Albacete